Mohd Amar bin Rohidan (born 23 April 1987) is a Malaysian former professional footballer who plays as a midfielder.

Clubs career

Perlis
Amar started his career with Perlis FA in year 2005 and played with the team for six seasons.

Kedah
Then, he decided to move on and join to their rival teams, Kedah FA for two seasons. In 2012 Malaysia Super League seasons, he refuses to sign a new contract after his team was relegated to Malaysia Premier League.

FELDA United
After that, he signed with Felda United which competing in the 2013 Malaysia Super League. After playing a season with Felda United, he was released by the club.

Kelantan
For 2014 seasons, he later joins Kelantan FA with two years contract. He replaced the position of Shakir Shaari as the defensive midfielder after Shakir decided to leave Kelantan.

Kedah
After leaving Kelantan at the end of the 2015 season, he joined Kedah FA in the 2016 season for his second stint at the club. He won the 2016 Malaysia Cup with the team, but were released at the end of the season. Amar has not played professionally for any club since then, although he turned up for Perlis in the amateur King's Gold Cup competition in 2018.

International career
He is also a member of the Malaysian national football team. In November 2010, Amar was called up to the Malaysia national squad by coach K. Rajagopal for the 2010 AFF Suzuki Cup. Malaysia won the 2010 AFF Suzuki Cup title for the first time in their history.

Honours
Perlis  FA
 Malaysia Cup:2006;Runner Up2005
 Malaysia Super League:2005;Runner Up 2009
 FA Cup Malaysia:2006,2007
 Charity Shield:2006,2007;RunnerUp 2005

Kelantan FA
Malaysia FA Cup:2015 Malaysia FA Cup(Runner up)

Kedah FA
Malaysia Premier League Winner : 2015
 Malaysia Cup: 2016

Personal life
On 13 Mac 2011, Amar Rohidan married with Farhana.

References

External links
 
 

Living people
1987 births
Malaysian people of Malay descent
Malaysian footballers
People from Kedah
Malaysia international footballers
Kedah Darul Aman F.C. players
Perlis FA players
Perak F.C. players
Kelantan FA players
Malaysia Super League players
Association football midfielders
Footballers at the 2010 Asian Games
Southeast Asian Games gold medalists for Malaysia
Southeast Asian Games medalists in football
Competitors at the 2009 Southeast Asian Games
Asian Games competitors for Malaysia